Asca arboriensis is a species of mite in the family Ascidae.

References

Further reading

 

arboriensis
Articles created by Qbugbot
Animals described in 1966